Roger Dumas may refer to:

 Roger Dumas (actor), a French actor
 Roger Dumas (composer), a French composer
 Roger Dumas, a photographer for The Archives of the Planet